Workers Playtime is a 1988 album by Billy Bragg.  Originally released on the Go! Discs label, it is his fourth release but third full-length album.  It was reissued on compact disc in September 1996 on the Cooking Vinyl label before being remastered, expanded and reissued in 2006 on Cooking Vinyl in the UK and on the Yep Roc label in the United States.

The album reached number 18 in the UK albums chart.

It was voted number 499 in the third edition of Colin Larkin's All Time Top 1000 Albums (2000).

The original album cover has the subtitle "Capitalism Is Killing Music", referring to the British Phonographic Industry's then-current campaign that "Home Taping Is Killing Music".

The album originally had a region- and format-specific price printed on the artwork, signifying the maximum price the album should be sold for (as "Pay no more than"), similar to Bragg's previous albums. For example, in the UK, no more than £4.99 should have been paid for the LP or cassette and £7.99 for the compact disc. Other prices included $15.99 for the LP or cassette in the US and AUD$23.99 for the Compact Disc in Australia. This particular aspect of the album was referenced in the TV series John Safran's Music Jamboree. The prices were removed on subsequent re-releases.

Track listing
All tracks written by Billy Bragg except where noted.

Disc one
"She's Got a New Spell" – 3:26
"Must I Paint You a Picture?" (Extended Version 7:08 Minutes) – 5:32
"Tender Comrade" – 2:50
"The Price I Pay" – 3:34
"Little Time Bomb" – 2:17
"Rotting on Remand" – 3:37
"Valentine's Day is Over" – 4:53
"Life With the Lions" – 3:06
"The Only One" – 3:26
"The Short Answer" – 4:59
"Waiting for the Great Leap Forwards" – 4:35

Disc two (2006 reissue)
"The Only One" (demo version) – 3:36
"The Price I Pay" (demo version) – 4:01
"Love Has No Pride" (Eric Kaz, Libby Titus) – 3:35
"That's Entertainment" (Paul Weller) – 3:53
"She's Got a New Spell" (demo version) – 2:44
"The Short Answer" (demo version) – 5:21
"Little Time Bomb" (demo version) – 2:21
"Bad Penny" (demo version) – 3:05
"Reason to Believe" (live) (Tim Hardin) – 2:12
"Must I Paint You a Picture?" (extended version) – 7:13
"Raglan Road" (live) (Patrick Kavanagh, traditional) – 3:46

Personnel

Musicians
Billy Bragg – vocals, acoustic guitar, electric guitar, triangle
Danny Thompson – double bass
Cara Tivey – piano, vocals, Hammond C-3 organ
Micky Waller – drums
Wiggy – electric guitar, acoustic guitar, 12 string guitar, slide guitar, backing vocals
Tony Maronie – percussion
Bruce Thomas – bass guitar
Dave Woodhead – trumpets, flugelhorn
B. J. Cole – pedal steel guitar
Martin Belmont – electric guitar
Barb Jungr – harmonica
Julia Palmer – cello
Camilla Brunt – violin
Kenny Jones – 6 and 12 string acoustic guitar
Theresa Pamplin – viola
Donna Welchman – violin
Porky – backing vocals
Jayne Creamer – backing vocals
Kaya Jenner – backing vocals
Michelle Shocked – backing vocals

Production
Joe Boyd – producer
Wiggy – producer
Martin Hayles – engineer
Graham Dear – assistant engineer
Lawrence Watson – photography
Liu Chich-Kuei – artwork
Thumbnail – design

References
Information from the Official Billy Bragg website discography and the 2006 reissue CD liner notes unless otherwise noted.

Billy Bragg albums
1988 albums
Albums produced by Joe Boyd
Go! Discs albums
Cooking Vinyl albums